Caterina Mete (born 10 September 1980) is an Australian dancer, singer and choreographer, and member of children's band The Wiggles.

Mete began dancing at the age of seven, beginning with tap, jazz and ballroom dancing. Her early employment included cheerleading for the Melbourne Storm. In 2003, she became a Wiggly dancer, successfully auditioning to play Dorothy the Dinosaur for The Wiggles in a separate spin-off show. In this role, she caught the attention of The Wiggles and became a regular dancer for the group, performing in recordings and touring with the group to perform in live shows. She also performed choreography for the group, and played a key role in spotting Lachlan Gillespie who became a member of the group.

In 2021, The Wiggles sought to increase diversity in the group by adding four additional supporting members. Shortly after this change Emma Watkins, one of the main group members left the group. This caused Tsehay Hawkins to be promoted into Watkins' role as the main yellow Wiggle, while Mete assumed Hawkins' role as a Red Wiggle.

References

Australian ballerinas
The Wiggles members
Living people
1980 births